Norwescon is one of the largest regional science fiction and fantasy conventions in the United States. Located in SeaTac in Washington state, Norwescon has been running continuously since 1978.

"Norwescon" was also the name of the 8th World Science Fiction Convention, held in Portland, Oregon, in 1950.

History
Norwescon grew out of the desire of its founders to host a Worldcon in Seattle in 1981. However, there was one major issue — at the time, most of Pacific Northwest fandom had little or no experience in running cons. Norwescon was therefore originally formed as an effort to get some practice for Worldcon. Realizing they would need a large group of people from which to draw volunteers, the founders also started the Northwest Science Fiction Society or NWSFS.

The first Norwescon was held in a then-unincorporated area now known as the city of SeaTac, Washington. It featured Theodore Sturgeon as its Guest of Honor (GoH) and drew just over 400 attendees. The next year, Norwescon moved up the street to the Hyatt Hotel, the site of the only Seattle-sponsored Worldcon. The Hyatt was the site of Norwescons II through VII, at which point the convention began feeling the pressures of growth; it was then moved to SeaTac's Red Lion Inn. With growth came associated problems, and after two years at the Red Lion, Norwescon was forced to find a new location on short notice. The convention moved back to the Hyatt for a convention called Alternacon. The next year brought a big move to the city of Tacoma, where the Sheraton hosted Norwescon for five years. 1993 brought the convention to the Bellevue area, and in 1994 Norwescon returned to the site of the old Red Lion Inn, now known as the DoubleTree Hotel SeaTac.

Norwescon's Guest of Honor list has grown over the years, starting with a list of three: Writer Guest of Honor, Fan Guest of Honor, and Toastmaster. The list now includes artists, scientists, volunteers and special guests as well as many other professionals. Norwescon has always made an effort to invite guests who are deserving of the honor, and has thus had a prestigious line of guests.

Norwescon also hosts the Philip K. Dick Award, given to the author of the best original novel appearing in the previous year in paperback form without prior publication as a hardback. The first recipient of the Philip K. Dick Memorial Award was Rudy Rucker for his novel, Software.

Past conventions
 Norwescon I - March 25–26, 1978; GoH: Theodore Sturgeon; FGoH John D. Berry; TM Alan E. Nourse; Attendance 415
 Norwescon II - March 23–25, 1979; GoH: Philip José Farmer; FGoH Loren MacGregor; TM Elizabeth A. Lynn; Attendance 725
 Norwescon III - March 28–30, 1980; GoH: Alfred Bester; FGoH Fred Pohl; TM Theodore Sturgeon; Attendance 732
 Norwescon IV - March 27–29, 1981; GoH: Samuel R. Delany; FGoH Jack Palmer, Pauline Palmer, and Tilda Palmer; TM Philip Klass (William Tenn); Attendance 1410
 Norwescon V - March 18–21, 1982; GoH: Thomas Disch; AGoH Michael Whelan; FGoH Bob Shaw; TM Richard A. Lupoff; Attendance 1371
 Norwescon VI - March 17–20, 1983; GoH: Jack Williamson; AGoH Richard Powers; FGoH Art Widner; TM Algis Budrys; Attendance ?
 Norwescon VII - March 22–25, 1984; GoH: L. Sprague & Catherine Crook de Camp; AGoH Don Maitz; FGoH Jack Speer; TM Marta Randall; Attendance ~1700
 Norwescon VIII - March 14–17, 1985; GoH: Brian Aldiss; AGoH Jack Gaughan (did not attend); FGoH Rich Brown; TM Robert Silverberg; Science GoH Gregory Benford; Attendance ?
 Norwescon IX - March 20–23, 1986; GoH: Anne McCaffrey; AGoH Kelly Freas; FGoH Greg Bennett; TM Spider Robinson; Science GoH James Oberg; Attendance "HUGE" (estimates top 3000)
 Norwescons's Alternacon - March 26–29, 1987; AGoH Dan Reeder; GoH: Orson Scott Card; FGoH Marty & Robbie Cantor; TM David Hartwell; Attendance <1700
 Norwescon X - March 24–27, 1988; GoH: Marion Zimmer Bradley; AGoH Rick Sternbach; FGoH Jon Gustafson; TM David Gerrold; Special GoH Avram Davidson; Attendance 2032
 Norwescon XI - March 23–26, 1989; GoH: Algis Budrys; AGoH David Mattingly; FGoH Mike Glyer; TM Steven Barnes; Science GoH Dr. Alan E. Nourse; Special GoH Avram Davidson; Attendance 2292
 Norwescon XII - March 29-April 1, 1990; GoH: Roger Zelazny; AGoH David Cherry; FGoH Pat Mueller; TM Dan Reeder; Science GoH Dr. John G. Cramer; Volunteer GoH Joe Wheeler Attendance 2274
 Norwescon XIV - March 28–31, 1991; GoH: Stanley Schmidt; AGoH James Warhola; FGoH Becky Thomson; TM Edward Bryant; Special GoH Forrest J. Ackerman; Volunteer GoH Joe Laybourn; Attendance 2320
 Norwescon XV - March 26–29, 1992; GoH: Poul Anderson; AGoh Alan Gutierrez; FGoH Willie Siros; TM J. Steven York; Volunteer GoH Celia Smith; Attendance ~2400
 Norwescon XVI - March 25–28, 1993; GoH: Betty Ballantine (did not attend); AGoH Janny Wurts; FGoH Pat Mueller; TM Bonnie Baker; Science GoH Chris Jonientz-Trisler (Sunday only); Special GoH Anne McCaffrey (did not attend); surprise GoH Mike Jittlov; Volunteer GoH Teresa Janssen; Attendance ~2430
 Norwescon XVII - March 31-April 3, 1994; GoH: Kurtz & Scott MacMillan; AGoH Darrell K. Sweet; FGoH Peggy Rae Pavlat; TM Janna Silverstein; Attendance ~2680
 Norwescon XVIII - April 6–9, 1995; GoH: Robert Silverberg; AGoH James Gurney; TM Dragon Dronet; Science GoH Dr. Jane Robinson; Volunteer GoH Danny Rudesill; Attendance ~2675
 Norwescon XIX - April 4–7, 1996; GoH: A.C. Crispin; AGoH Tom Kidd; FGoH Kitty Canterbury; TM Janna Silverstein; Volunteer GoH David Valentine; Attendance ~2590
 Norwescon XX - March 27–30, 1997; GoH: Larry Niven, A. E. van Vogt; AGoH Vincent Di Fate; FGoH Brad Foster; Science GoH Dr. Robert L. Forward; Volunteer GoH Glenda Hedden; Attendance ?
 Norwescon XXI - April 9–12, 1998; GoH: Neil Gaiman; AGoH Brian Froud; FGoH John Lorentz, Ruth Sachter; Science GoH Patricia MacEwen; Volunteer GoH Anthony Ward; Attendance ?
 Norwescon XXII - April 1–4, 1999; GoH: Harry Turtledove; AGoH Richard Hescox; FGoH Jack Chalker, Eva Whitley; Science GoH Jack Horner; Volunteer GoH Susan Allen; Spotlighted Publisher Ministry of Whimsy; Attendance
 Norwescon XXIII - April 20–23, 2000; GoH: David Brin, Gregory Benford; AGoH Barclay Shaw; FGoH Bjo and John Trimble; Spotlighted Publisher HarperCollins and Eos represented by Jennifer Brehl; Attendance 2765
 Norwescon XXIV - April 12–15, 2001; GoH: Connie Willis; AGoH Bob Eggleton; FGoH Charles N. Brown; Special GoH James P. Hogan; Special GoH Dragon Dronet; Spotlighted Publisher Bantam Dell Publishing Group represented by Anne Lesley Groell; Attendance 3054
 Norwescon XXV - March 28–31, 2002; GoH: Jack Vance; AGoH Brom; FGoH Andrew I. Porter; Spotlighted Publisher WOTC Publishing; Attendance 2787
 Norwescon XXVI - April 17–20, 2003; GoH: Jane Yolen; AGoH Jim Burns; Science GoH Geoffrey Landis; Special GoH Michael Whelan; Spotlighted Publisher Del Rey Books; Attendance 2718
 Norwescon XXVII - April 8–11, 2004; GoH Mike Resnick; AGoH Don Dixon; Special GoH Joe Haldeman; Science GoH Ben Bova; Spotlighted Publisher Baen Books represented by Jim Baen; Attendance 2610
 Norwescon XXVIII - March 24–27, 2005; GoH Michael Bishop; AGoH Stephen Hickman; Special GoH Alan Dean Foster; Science GoH Suzette Haden Elgin; Spotlighted Publisher TOR Books represented by Tom Doherty; Attendance 2603
 Norwescon XXIX - April 13–16, 2006; GoH Lois McMaster Bujold; AGoH Donato Giancola; TM Robert J. Sawyer; Spotlighted Publisher DAW Books represented by Betsy Wollheim and Sheila Gilbert; Attendance 2758
 Norwescon XXX - April 5–8, 2007; GoH Kim Stanley Robinson; AGoH Luis Royo; Science GoH Donna Shirley; Spotlighted Publisher The Magazine of Fantasy & Science Fiction represented by Gordon Van Gelder; Attendance 3024
 Norwescon XXXI - March 20–24, 2008; GoH Dan Simmons; AGoH Ciruelo; Special GoH Naomi Novik; Attendance 3030
 Norwescon XXXII - April 9–12, 2009; GoH R.A. Salvatore; AGoH Todd Lockwood; Special GoH Geno Salvatore; Spotlighted Publisher Wizards of the Coast; Attendance 3115
 Norwescon XXXIII - April 1–4, 2010; GoH Vernor Vinge; AGoH John Jude Palencar; Science Guest John G. Cramer; Special GoH Cory Doctorow; Spotlighted Publisher Tor Books; Attendance 3349
 Norwescon 34 - April 21–24, 2011; GoH Patricia McKillip; AGoH Kinuko Craft; PSIence Guest Marie D. Jones; Special Guest Jim Butcher; Special Guest Shannon Butcher; Spotlight Publisher PYR; Attendance ~3500
 Norwescon 35 - April 5–8, 2012; GoH Stephen Baxter; AGoH John Picacio; Science Guest Bridget Landry; Spotlight Publisher DAW Books; Attendance ~3100
 Norwescon 36 - March 28–31, 2013; Writer GoH Catherine Asaro; Artist GoH Lee Moyer; Science GoH Edward Tenner; Special GoH Gardner Dozois; Norwescon 36 Grandmaster Terry Brooks; Spotlight Publisher Baen Books; Attendance ~3200
 Norwescon 37 - April 17–20, 2014; Writer GoH Michael Moorcock; Artist GoH Robert Gould; Science GoH Catherine S. Plesko; Costuming GoH Anima! X; Special GoH Seanan McGuire; Spotlight Publisher 47North
 Norwescon 38 - April 2–5, 2015; Writer GoH George R. R. Martin; Artist GoH Julie Dillon; Science GoH Amy Mainzer; Spotlight Publisher Random House
 Norwescon 39 - March 24–27, 2016; Writer GoH Tanya Huff; Artist GoH Janny Wurts; Science GoH Dr. William Hartmann; Spotlight Publisher DAW Books
 Norwescon 40 - April 13–16, 2017; Writer GoH Ian McDonald; Artist GoH Cory & Catska Ench; Science GoH Ethan Siegel; Spotlight Publisher Angry Robot Books
 Norwescon 41 - March 29-April 1, 2018; Writer GoH Ken Liu; Artist GoH Galen Dara; Science GoH Mathew Wedel; Spotlight Publisher Green Ronin Publishing
 Norwescon 42 - April 18–21, 2019; Writer GoH Mary Robinette Kowal; Artist GoH Tran Nguyen; Science GoH Dan Koboldt; Special Guest of Honor - Nancy Pearl; Spotlight Publisher - Subterranean Press
 Norwescon 43 - April 1-4, 2021; Writer GoH Jacqueline Carey; Artist GoH Sana Takeda; Science GoH Dr. Susan Langley; Spotlight Publisher Tor Books
 Norwescon 44 - April 14–17, 2022; Writer GoH Cat Rambo; Artist GoH Rob Carlos; Spotlight Publisher Fairwood Press; and Special Guests Connor Alexander and Lydia K. Valentine.

Upcoming conventions
 Norwescon 45 - April 6-9, 2023; guests of honor will include Writer GoH P. Djèlí Clark, Artist GoH Eric Wilkerson, and Spotlight Publisher ''Uncanny Magazine.

References

External links
 Official Site
 The Philip K. Dick Award

Seattle Area conventions
Science fiction conventions in the United States
Fantasy conventions
Recurring events established in 1978
Culture of Seattle
1978 establishments in Washington (state)